Barry Wood (born 26 December 1942) is an English former cricketer, who played 12 Test matches for the England cricket team as an opening batsman, as well as 13 One Day Internationals. He played first-class cricket for Yorkshire in 1964, for Lancashire from 1966 to 1979, and for Derbyshire from 1980 to 1983, where he was the captain for three seasons.

Life and career

Wood was born in Ossett, Yorkshire, England. He made his first-class debut for Yorkshire in 1964 but, due to limited opportunities, transferred to Lancashire in 1966, where he became the first ever Yorkshireman to score two Roses hundreds (reaching his century with a six on both occasions) in the same season against his native county. In the 1970s, by winning more Man of the Match gold awards than any other player in the history of the game, he was arguably the most valuable player of a Lancashire team that were the undisputed one day kings of English cricket. This record was finally broken by Graham Gooch. That side was captained by Jack Bond and included a number of international players: Clive Lloyd, David Lloyd and Peter Lever. This team won six trophies in six years – the Players County League in 1969, the John Player League in 1970 and the Gillette Cup in 1970, 1971, 1972 and 1975. Wood's highest first-class score was 198 v Glamorgan and he still holds the record at Lancashire for a fifth wicket partnership of 249 with Andy Kennedy against Warwickshire at Edgbaston in 1971.

Wood's good form for Lancashire led to his selection for his first Test against Australia at The Oval in 1972. Against a fearsome Australian bowling attack, spearheaded by the great Dennis Lillee, he made a very fine score of 90 which led to his selection for a tour of India and Pakistan. However, he had a lean time in the subcontinent and was dropped from the side. He was selected as a replacement in a New Zealand tour but failed again. The lateness of his selection was a contributing factor as he completed a 63-hour trip from the West Indies to New Zealand just before the first Test. In 1975, he played Tests against Australia, standing up to the menacing duo of Lillee and Thomson scoring a half century. His final Test was against Pakistan in 1978. In his prime, Wood was widely regarded as the finest player of fast bowling in the country.

Wood played thirteen One Day Internationals between 1972 and 1982, including playing in the inaugural World Cup in 1975. His One Day International batting record was better than his record in Tests, and he was a handy bowler as well, taking nine wickets. In addition, he was one of the best fielders in the gully and in the outfield was the pioneer of many of the dives which are now part and parcel of the modern game. He was the first person to be dismissed by the first ball in an ODI match, bowled by Andy Roberts at Scarborough on 26 August 1976.  Somewhat surprisingly recalled four years after his last international match, aged 39, in 1982, he made his highest One Day International score, 78 not out, against India on his first game back, also winning the man of the match award; but he was dropped after the next match and did not play for England again.

Wood and controversy seemed closely linked, and an example of this was the 1975 pay dispute which resulted in Lancashire's international players at that time (Wood, Lever and Frank Hayes) being suspended – Lever and Hayes for three games and Wood for six games. He also left the club in controversial circumstances when, shortly after receiving a record testimonial cheque of £62,429 in 1979, he again entered into a pay dispute marking the end of his Old Trafford career.

Wood moved to Derbyshire in 1980, but only after a protracted dispute with the TCCB in which they attempted to block his registration. However, in a ballot by the P.C.A, his fellow professional players backed him overwhelmingly in a vote of 154 for and 31 against, and his transfer was duly completed. He became captain in 1981 and led them to victory in the Nat West Trophy final against Northamptonshire, which was the first silverware the club had won in its entire history. He was captain again in the 1983 season but resigned midway through, and this would prove to be his last first-class season, when Derbyshire came ninth in the Championship. He was then professional for Barnoldswick C.C.in the Ribblesdale league for the remainder of that season following the departure of their professional, Trevor Franklin, who joined the New Zealand squad and who subsequently sored a century at Lords against England.

Wood subsequently played for Cheshire from 1986 to 1989, where he had the dubious distinction of recording five consecutive noughts. However, he also produced many fine performances, most notably in the historic win over Northamptonshire in the first round of the Nat West Trophy in 1988. Described as the greatest game in Cheshire's history, Wood took 2–39 and scored 40 before being run out to earn his record-breaking 21st and final Man of the Match gold award. He was 46 years old at the time.

The following season (aged 47, and ten years after his last game for the club), an injury to Wasim Akram led to him being recalled as twelfth man for Lancashire in their championship match versus Warwickshire at Old Trafford, whereupon he took a superb catch in the gully to dismiss Andy Moles.
Wood played as professional for Saddleworth league club Shaw during the summers of 1989 and 1990.
Wood's son, Nathan Wood, played for Lancashire, Cheshire and Young England.

Wood was also a fine footballer and played midfield for Ossett Town in the Yorkshire League in the mid-1960s and for Bradford (Park Avenue) in the Northern Premier League in the 1970s and also Stalybridge Celtic

References

External links
 

1942 births
Living people
People from Ossett
Derbyshire cricket captains
English cricket captains
England Test cricketers
England One Day International cricketers
English cricketers
Cheshire cricketers
Lancashire cricketers
Cricketers at the 1975 Cricket World Cup
Yorkshire cricketers
Marylebone Cricket Club cricketers
Eastern Province cricketers
Cricketers from Yorkshire